This is a list of flag bearers, who have represented Slovenia at the Olympics.

Flag bearers carry the national flag of their country at the opening ceremony of the Olympic Games.

See also
Slovenia at the Olympics
List of flag bearers for Yugoslavia at the Olympics

References

Slovenia at the Olympics
Slovenia
Olympic flagbearers